Headquarters of the Malankara Orthodox Syrian Church. Residence of the Catholicos of the East and Malankara Metropolitan  Many previous catholicoi including Paulose II (Indian Orthodox Church) are entombed there.

Leaders interred 

 Baselios Geevarghese II
Baselios Augen I
Baselios Mathews I
Baselios Paulose II

Relics 
Relics of St. Thomas

References 

Malankara Orthodox Syrian church buildings